Philippa Bevans (10 Feb 1913 – 10 May 1968) was an English actress of stage and screen. She was born in London, England, and was the daughter of actors Lionel Bevans and Viola Roache. She originally appeared as a child actress on stage.

Along with her mother, she was part of the cast of the original 1956 Broadway production of My Fair Lady that starred Rex Harrison and Julie Andrews. Bevans is also featured on the original cast recording.

Filmography

References

External links

English film actresses
English stage actresses
1913 births
1968 deaths
20th-century English actresses
Actresses from London